Phyllidioidea is a taxonomic superfamily of colorful sea slugs, dorid nudibranchs, marine gastropod mollusks.

Taxonomy
Family Phyllidiidae Rafinesque, 1814
Family Dendrodorididae O'Donoghue, 1924
Family Mandeliidae Valdés & Gosliner, 1999

References

Nudipleura